Fantine Lesaffre (born 10 November 1994) is a French swimmer. She is the European champion in 400 metre individual medley event at the 2018 Glasgow.

In the Autumn of 2019 she was member of the inaugural International Swimming League swimming for the Energy Standard International Swim Club, who won the team title in Las Vegas, Nevada, in December.

References

External links
 

1994 births
Living people
French female medley swimmers
Olympic swimmers of France
Swimmers at the 2016 Summer Olympics
Sportspeople from Roubaix
European Aquatics Championships medalists in swimming
Swimmers at the 2013 Mediterranean Games
Mediterranean Games competitors for France
Swimmers at the 2020 Summer Olympics
20th-century French women
21st-century French women